Xidaotang ("Hall of the Western Dao," i.e. Islam)--originally called Jinxingtang , the "Gold Star Hall"; also called the Hanxue pai , the "Han Studies Sect" —is a Sino-Islamic religious body / special economic community centered in Gansu province. The Xidaotang is mainly distributed in Lintan and Hezheng County in Gansu, and also has followers in Qinghai, Xinjiang, and Sichuan.

Practices 
Its religious practices broadly resemble those of the Qadim (Gedimu), with some Jahriyya elements. Great emphasis is placed on shari'a (jiaocheng ),and tariqa (daocheng ), "which gradually leads to depersonalization and mystical union with God." Its members organize collectively and work together. One important focus is education. The group observes such holidays as the birthday of the Islamic prophet Muhammad (Mawlid an-Nabi), the anniversary of his death, and the anniversary of the death of Ma Qixi. However, no mausoleum was built for Ma Qixi.

History 

Founded in 1901 by Ma Qixi (1857–1914), a Chinese Muslim from Lintan (formerly Taozhou), it fuses traditional Sunni Hanafi Islam with study of the Confucian classics and the Han Kitab. The group lived communally, supporting itself through a trade network which extended into the Tibetan border regions.

In 1914, Hui general Ma Anliang, affiliated with the rival Khufiyya order, slew Ma Qixi, and was nearly successful in exterminating the sect, but a portion evaded capture. Hui warlord Ma Zhongying raided Hui and Tibetan encampments in the 1920s, causing another exodus. The Xidaotang pledged allegiance to the Kuomintang after their rise to power, and in 1941, the Hui General Bai Chongxi introduced Chiang Kai-shek to Xidaotang leader Ma Mingren in Chongqing.

Other leaders in the movement were:
 1918-1946: Ma Mingren (1896–1946)
 1947-1958: Min Xuecheng (1882–1957) (i.e. Min Zhidao).

See also
 Muslim groups in China
 menhuan 门宦
 gongbei 拱北
 Gedimu
 Liu Zhi 刘智 (1660–1745)
 Tekke (罕卡[hanka] Khanqah, 扎维叶[zaweiye] Zawiya)
 Ma Qixi

References

Works cited

Cihai ("Sea of Words“), Shanghai cishu chubanshe, Shanghai 2002,  (Article: Xidaotang)
 Hu Fan: "Islam in Shaanxi: Past and Present". Diss. Bonn 2008
 Shoujiang Mi, Jia You: Islam in China, Chinese Intercontinental Press, 2004;  (web)

Further reading
 Michael Dillon: China's Muslim Hui Community 1999
 Dru C. Gladney: Muslim Chinese: ethnic nationalism in the People's Republic (Xi Dao Tang, S.56 f.)

External links
 West Khanqa at ChinaCulture.org
 Gongshe xingzhe de Musilin zuzhi - Xidaotang at ChinaCulture.org
 Zhongguo Xidaotang Linxia Machang Qingzhensi shengjihui - Chinese (photos from the Machang mosque in Linxia) at BBS.ChinaSufi.cn

Islamic branches
Islam in China